The women's 3000 metres event  at the 1993 IAAF World Indoor Championships was held on 13 March.

Results

References

3000
3000 metres at the World Athletics Indoor Championships
1993 in women's athletics